Inter-alpha-trypsin inhibitor heavy chain H4 is a protein that in humans is encoded by the ITIH4 gene.

See also 
 Inter-alpha-trypsin inhibitor
 ITIH1
 ITIH2
 ITIH3

References

Further reading